The Sovi Basin is located in Naitasiri Province, on the island of Viti Levu, the largest island in Fiji. Covering approximately 19,600 hectares, the basin is blanketed by a well-preserved tropical lowland forest, which is Fiji's largest and most biologically diverse. Sovi basin resides within the Polynesia/Micronesia biodiversity hotspot, one of 34 hot spots throughout the globe. The site is to be protected in a partnership between Fiji Water and Conservation International. The rainforest, wilderness area and high
scenic valley contribute to its national significance as outlined in Fiji's Biodiversity Strategy and Action Plan.

A  area covering the basin is the Sovi Basin Important Bird Area. This area supports the largest protected populations of many of Fiji's restricted-range species, including the endangered Long-legged thicketbird, the vulnerable Pink-billed parrotfinch and Shy Ground-dove, and the near threatened Masked shining parrot.

World Heritage Status 
This site was added to the UNESCO World Heritage Tentative List on October 26, 1999 in the Cultural category.

References 

Landforms of Fiji
Basins
Landforms of Oceania
Preliminary Register of Sites of National Significance in Fiji
World Heritage Tentative List
Important Bird Areas of Fiji